The 1982 NCAA Division I Men's Golf Championships was the 44th annual NCAA-sanctioned golf tournament to determine the individual and team national champions of men's collegiate golf at the University Division level in the United States.

The tournament was held at the Pinehurst Resort in Pinehurst, North Carolina.

Houston won the team championship, the Cougars' fourteenth NCAA title.

Billy Ray Brown, also from Houston, won the individual title.

Individual results

Individual champion
 Billy Ray Brown, Houston

Team results

 Missed cut: Clemson, Oklahoma, Georgia, USC, Ball State, North Texas State, Tennessee, Oral Roberts, Long Beach State, New Mexico, Florida State, ETSU, American, Temple, Indiana, Holy Cross
DC = Defending champions
Debut appearance

References

NCAA Men's Golf Championship
Golf in North Carolina
NCAA Golf Championship
NCAA Golf Championship
NCAA Golf Championship